Hoseynabad-e Sheybani may refer to:
 Hoseynabad Sheybani-ye Kavir, Isfahan Province
 Hoseynabad-e Sheybani, South Khorasan